Erbín Alejandro Trejo Macias (born June 3, 1990, in Mexico City) is a Mexican professional footballer who plays as a midfielder.

Career
Trejo began playing football with Toluca's Primera "A" affiliate Atlético Mexiquense. After the club withdrew from the Primera "A" in 2009, Toluca manager José Manuel de la Torre selected Trejo for training with the parent club. He made his Primera División debut July 26, 2009 against CD Guadalajara, a game Toluca won 4–3.

Honours

Club
Querétaro
Supercopa MX: 2017

References

External links
 
 
 

1990 births
Living people
Liga MX players
Ascenso MX players
Atlético Mexiquense footballers
Deportivo Toluca F.C. players
Querétaro F.C. footballers
Club Atlético Zacatepec players
Footballers from Mexico City
Mexican footballers
Association football midfielders